Namdalsavisa is a daily, local newspaper serving the district of Namdal, specifically Namsos, Norway.

Profile
Namdalsavisa is published in six times per week in Trøndelag. It was known as Namdal Arbeiderblad until the mid-1990s.

As of 1981 the owner of the paper was the Labour Party and trade unions. The newspaper is currently owned by A-pressen. It is published in tabloid format.

Rolf A. Amdal, a member of the Labor Party, served as the editor-in-chief of Namdalsavisa.

The 2007 circulation of the paper was 12,898 copies.

References

1917 establishments in Norway
Publications established in 1917
Daily newspapers published in Norway
Norwegian-language newspapers
Amedia
Mass media in Trøndelag
Companies based in Trøndelag